Diphenylalanine is a term that has recently been used to describe the unnatural amino acid similar to the two amino acids alanine and phenylalanine.  It has been used for the synthesis of pseudopeptide analogues which are capable of inhibiting certain enzymes.

Individual enantiomers of this compound can be synthesized via electrophilic amination of a chiral oxazolidinone derivative of 3,3-diphenylpropanoic acid.

A historical use of the term diphenylalanine refers to the dipeptide of phenylalanine.

References

Amino acids